Nakhleh  is a mixed Sunni Muslim and Maronite Christian city in the Koura District of Lebanon. It is 340 meters above sea level, has an area of 8 square kilometers, with more than 10,000 residents.

References

External links
 Nakhleh

Populated places in the North Governorate
Koura District
Sunni Muslim communities in Lebanon
Maronite Christian communities in Lebanon